Pope Innocent III (r. 1198–1216) created 41 cardinals in ten consistories that he conducted throughout his pontificate. This included - in his first allocation in late 1198 - a future successor.

December 1198
 Ugolino dei Conti di Segni
 Gérard O. Cist.

December 1200

 Gregorio
 Benedetto
  Can. Reg.
 Matteo
 Giovanni dei Conti di Segni

December 1202
 Roger
 Gualterio
 Raoul de Neuville

1205

 Nicola de Romanis
 
 
 
 
 Guala Bicchieri Can. Reg.
 Ottaviano dei Conti di Segni
 
 Giovanni
 Paio Galvão O.S.B.
 Stephen Langton

March 1206
 Siegfried von Eppstein

1207
 Pietro O.S.B. Cas.
 Mauro

June 1211
 Gerardo da Sesso O.Cist.

18 February 1212

 Angelo
 Giovanni Colonna
 Pierre Duacensis
 Bertrando
  O.Cist.
 Robert Curzon

1213
 Rainiero Can. Reg.

1216

 
 Raniero Capocci O.Cist.
 Romano Bonaventura
 
 Tommaso da Capua
  O.S.B. Cas.

Notes and references

Sources

College of Cardinals
Innocent III
Inn
Cardinals created by Pope Innocent III